Renate Eggebrecht (born 12 August 1944) is a German violinist and record producer.

Biography 
Born in Selent, Schleswig-Holstein, Germany, Eggebrecht received her initial musical training from her mother, starting at the age of four. At the age of seven, she became a pupil of Hans Hilf, who had studied in the master class of Walther Davisson at the Leipzig Conservatory. From the age of twelve, Eggebrecht studied violin with Friedrich Wührer, son of the pianist Friedrich Wührer, and piano with Wilhelm Rau at the Lübeck College of Music. She continued her training at the Munich College of Music. Subsequently, she devoted herself to private studies with Prof. Wolfram König; attending master classes with Max Rostal, Seymion Snitkovsky and chamber music courses with the LaSalle Quartet.

In 1986, Eggebrecht founded the Fanny Mendelssohn Quartet with which she gave the world premiere performance of Fanny Hensel born Mendelssohn’s Piano Quartet in A-flat Major (1822) on 6 March 1988 in the Cultural Center Gasteig in Munich and the first Munich performance of the String Quartet in E-flat Major (1834) by this composer.
In 1988 she published the first editions of these chamber music works (Furore Verlag, Kassel).

To publicize unknown and forgotten music, Eggebrecht founded the music production firm of Troubadisc as a label for Classical music in 1991. For this label she made world premiere CD recordings of chamber music by Fanny Hensel born Mendelssohn, Ethel Smyth, Germaine Tailleferre, Grażyna Bacewicz and other women composers.

In 1993 Eggebrecht produced the complete songs of the French composer and pedagogue Nadia Boulanger, their first release on CD, and similarly the instrumental and piano songs of Ethel Smyth in 1997. Besides Fanny Hensel born Mendelssohn’s chamber music, Eggebrecht also produced the composer’s songs in 2001, and in 1998, with the pianist Wolfram Lorenzen, the piano cycle Das Jahr ("The Year") based on the composer’s fair copy as a CD world premiere.

With her ensemble, Eggebrecht recorded Darius Milhaud’s String Quartets nos. 1 - 8 for CD in 1994-5, as well as his works Machine agricoles op. 56 and Catalogue de Fleurs op. 60. In 1996 she also issued CD recordings by the Fanny Mendelssohn Quartet of the two large string quartets by Arthur Bliss .

In 1997, together with the German pianist Wolfram Lorenzen, Eggebrecht published CD recordings, in three volumes, of Edition Max Reger’s Piano Chamber Music. She subsequently recorded Max Reger’s complete works for violin solo, which she presented in 2003.

In 2000 she issued, together with the cellist Friedemann Kupsa, the world premiere recording of the Sonata for violin and violoncello (1947) by the Greek Schoenberg pupil Nikos Skalkottas, and the Sonatina op. 324 by Darius Milhaud. With Friedemann Kupsa she presented in 2002 the world premiere of the Duo-Sonata (1985) by the Romanian avant-garde composer Anatol Vieru and the "Strassenmusik No 16", op. 210 (2001) by the Greek composer Dimitri Nicolau.

She published the edition "VIOLIN SOLO" in 2002, beginning with Max Reger’s Chaconne op. 117, over Bach's Sei Solo and extending to the present day: A compendium of the modern violin literature.

Eggebrecht’s violin is a Stradivarius copy by Jean-Baptiste Vuillaume from 1858; her favorite bow is by Jules Fétique.

Discography 

TROUBADISC Musicproduction 
VIOLIN SOLO Vol.10, CD 2018: Einojuhani Rautavaara, Variétude (1974); Kalevi Aho, Solo I (Tumultos), Sonata per violino solo (1973); Pehr Henrik Nordgren, Sonata for violin solo op.104 (1999); Kalevi Aho, In Memoriam Pehr Henrik Nordgren (per violino solo) (2009);
VIOLIN SOLO Vol.9, CD 2017: Mieczysław Weinberg, Sonata No. 1 op.82 (1964), Sonata No. 2 op.95 (1967), Sonata No. 3 op.126 (1979); Alfred Schnittke, Fugue for violin solo (1953);
VIOLIN SOLO Vol.8, CD 2016: Karl Amadeus Hartmann, Sonatas No. 1 & 2, Suites No. 1 & 2 (1927);
VIOLIN SOLO Vol.7, 3-CD Set 2014: Johann Sebastian Bach, Sonatas and Partitas BWV 1001 - 1006 (1720); Valentin Silvestrov, Postludium II (1982/83).
VIOLIN SOLO Vol.6, CD 2014: Eugène Ysaӱe, Sonatas No. 1 - 6 (1923); Joaquín Rodrigo, Capriccio (1944).
VIOLIN SOLO Vol.5, SACD 2010: Sergey Prokofiev, Sonata op.115 (1947); Ljubica Marić, Sonata fantasia (1929); Grażyna Bacewicz, Polnish Caprices no.1 (1949) and no.2 (1952), Sonata (1941), Eduard Tubin, Sonata (1962), Suite on Estonian Dance Tunes (1979); Edison Denisov, Sonata (1978).
VIOLIN SOLO Vol.4, SACD 2008: Ernest Bloch, Suite no.1 (1958) and no.2 (1958); Igor Strawinsky, Élégie (1944); Grażyna Bacewicz, Four Caprices (1968); Aram Khachaturian, Sonata-Monologue (1975); Alfred Schnittke, a paganini (1982).
VIOLIN SOLO Vol.3, SACD 2007: Paul Hindemith, Studien (1916), Sonata op.11, Sonata op.31 No.1 (1924), Sonata op.31 No.2 (1924), Satz und Fragment aus einer Sonate (1925); Anatol Vieru, Capriccio (1977); Vladimir Martynov, Partita (1976).
VIOLIN SOLO Vol.2, SACD 2006: Erwin Schulhoff, Sonata (1927); Béla Bartók, Sonata (1944); Grażyna Bacewicz, Sonata (1958); Darius Milhaud, Sonatine pastorale op.383 (1960); Dimitri Nicolau, Sonata in Greek Mood op.228 (2002).
VIOLIN SOLO Vol.1, CD 2001: Max Reger, Chaconne op.117 no.4; Johanna Senfter, Sonata op.61 (1930); Nikos Skalkottas, Sonata (1925); Arthur Honegger, Sonata (1940).
Max Reger, the complete works for Solo Violin on 4 CDs 1999-2002: CD 1 2000, Four Sonatas op.42 (1899); CD 2 (2-CD Set) 1999, Seven Sonatas op.91 (1906); CD 3 2002, Seven Preludes and Fugues, Chaconne op.117 (1909/1912); CD 4 2002, Preludes and Fugues 131a (1914), Preludes and Fugues op. posth. (1902), Prelude op. posth. (1915).
Strassenmusik n.16, Duos for Violin & Violoncello, with Friedemann Kupsa violoncello, CD 2002: Zoltán Kodály, Duo op.7; Elizabeth Maconchy, Theme and Variations (1951); Anatol Vieru, Sonata (1984–85); Dimitri Nicolau, Strassenmusik n.16 op.210 (2001).
Duo mon amour, Duos for Violin & Violoncello, with Friedemann Kupsa violoncello, CD 2000: Maurice Ravel, Sonata (1920-1922); Darius Milhaud, Sonatina (1953); Arthur Honegger, Sonatina (1932); Nikos Skalkottas, Sonata (1947).
Max Reger, Edition Piano Chamber Music with Wolfram Lorenzen and Siegfried Mauser Piano, 3 CDs: CD 1 1997, Violin Sonatas opp. 72 (1903) and 139 (1915); CD 2 1997, Piano Quintet op.64 (1903), Piano Trio op.102 (1908); CD 3 1998, Piano Quartets opp.113 (1910) and 133 (1914).
Melomania String Quartets, CD 1997: Elisabeth Lutyens, Violeta Dinescu, Gloria Coates.
Arthur Bliss, CD 1997: String Quartet no.1 (1941), String Quartet no.2 (1950).
Darius Milhaud, String Quartets no.1 - 8, 3 CDs 1994-95: CD 1 1994, String Quartet no.1 op.5 (1912), String Quartet no.2 op.16 (1914–15); CD 2 1995, String Quartet no.3 op.31 (1916), String Quartet no.4 op.46 (1918), String Quartet no.5 op.64 (1920); CD 3 1996, String Quartet no.6 op.77 (1922), String Quartet no.7 op.87 (1925), String Quartet no.8 op.121 (1932).
Fanny Mendelssohn-Hensel, Chamber Music, CD 1994: Piano Quartet (1822), Chamber Music (1834), Piano Trio op.11 (1846-47).
Germaine Tailleferre, Chamber Music, CD 1993: Violin Sonata no.1 (1921), Violin Sonata no.2 (1948), String Quartet (1919), Piano Trio (1978)
Grażyna Bacewicz, String Quartets, CD 1992: String Quartet nr.4 (1950) String Quartet nr.6 (1959–60), String Quartet nr.7 (1965).
Ethel Smyth, Chamber Music Vol.3, CD 1992: Double Concerto in A (1926), (version with Piano), Horn: Franz Draxinger, Piano: Céline Dutilly).
Ethel Smyth, Chamber Music Vol.1 and Vol.2 (2-CD Set) 1991: Violin Sonata op.7 (1887), String Quintet op.1 (1883), String Quartet (1902/12)

1944 births
Living people
German violinists
Women classical violinists
21st-century violinists
21st-century women musicians